Urdu Academy, Delhi (Urdu: اردو اکادمی، دہلی) In the interest of developing the Urdu language and preserving the Urdu tradition and culture it was established in the year 1980.

History
The then Delhi Administration with a motto of establishing an Urdu institution to look after the development of the Urdu literature, cultural heritage, educational upliftment, in May 1981 under the Chairmanship of Lt. Governor of Delhi, established this institution as a composite institute with literary, cultural and educational goals. This was established in the heart of New Delhi.

According to the bill 2000, the Delhi government has announced Urdu as second official language of Delhi.

Activities
Activities are classified  in the following categories
 Publication, translation and printing of the books
 Research work, drama, festivals, seminars, symposiums, mushairas and national events.
 Honouring the literary personalities, awarding prizes, awards etc., 
 Establishment of Urdu Teaching centres and National Urdu  Library.

Publications
 Aiwan-e-Urdu (Urdu monthly magazine)
 Umang (Children's Urdu monthly magazine)

References

Organisations based in Delhi
Linguistic research institutes in India
Urdu Academies in India
1980 establishments in Delhi
Organizations established in 1980